The Capel Garmon Firedog is likely to be a late Iron Age Andiron found in Capel Garmon, Wales.

History 
The firedog was found in field at Carreg Goedog Farm in Capel Garmon, Conwy. The fire dog was found deeply buried on its side when found with a large stone at both ends. The way in which the artefact was placed suggests it may have been an offering to a Celtic god.

The antiquaries journal notes that the firedog was found in a peat bog in Denbighshire in 1852 and was a familiar with students who studied the iron Age. The firedog was kept in nearby Voelas Hall.

Colonnel J Wynne Finch who owned the firedog and was a governor of the National Museum of Wales, lent it to the National Museum in Cardiff for two years.

The firedog was transferred to Amgueddfa Cymru – National Museum Wales as an Acceptance in Lieu (AIL) scheme which enables a taxpayer to transfer art and heritage objects into public ownership as part or full payment of inheritance tax.

Proposed use 
The firedog was originally one of a pair at the hearth of a roundhouse of a chieftain. The animal head on each side of the fire dog could be a representation of a horse, dog or mythical beast.

J. Evans quotes an opinion on the potential use of the firedog, "I would suggest that this instrument is intended to hold the spits for roasting fowls, game or other small animals. … The loops on the side are evidently intended for that purpose, and it is probable that the horns of the two heads are intended for supporting a larger one".

X-raying of the firedog shows alongside a replica making process showed that the original blacksmith who made it was highly skilled and used 85 separately shaped elements, with it originally weighing around 38 kilos.

See also 

 Archaeology of Wales
 Celtic art
 Celtic Britons

References 

Welsh art
Iron Age Wales
Welsh artefacts
Collections of Amgueddfa Cymru – Museum Wales